Sufficiency may refer to:
 Logical sufficiency; see necessary and sufficient conditions
 sufficiency (statistics), sufficiency in statistical inference
 The sufficiency of Scripture, a Christian doctrine

See also
 Self-sufficiency
 Eco-sufficiency
 Sufficiency of disclosure, a patent law requirement